The 1st Naval Infantry Division was formed in February 1945 in Stettin from Marine-Schützen-Brigade Nord. Replacement troops were provided by 1. Marine-Infanterie-Ersatz- und Ausbildungs-Bataillon located in Lübberstedt bei Wesermünde. Activated from Kriegsmarine forces it fought on the northern flank of the German line on the Oder river until the end of the war.

It was one of five naval infantry divisions of the German Wehrmacht (the others being the 2nd, 3rd, 11th and 16th Marine Divisions).

Commanders
Konteradmiral Hans Hartmann (Kriegsmarine) 31 January - 28 February 1945
Generalmajor Wilhelm Bleckwenn (Army) 28 February - 8 May 1945

Composition
Marine-Infanterie-Regiment 1
Marine-Infanterie-Regiment 2
Marine-Infanterie-Regiment 4
Divisions-Füsilier-Kompanie 1 (later became Battalion)
Marine-Artillerie-Regiment 1
Panzer-Jäger-Abteilung 1
Marine-Feldersatz-Bataillon 1
Marine-Pionier-Bataillon 1 (from April 1945)
Marine-Nachrichten-Abteilung 1 (from  April 1945)

References

 

0*001
Military units and formations established in 1945
Military units and formations of the Kriegsmarine
Military units and formations disestablished in 1945